Capital Cargo International Airlines, Inc. was a cargo airline based in Orlando, Florida, USA from 1995 to 2013. It provided on-demand and wet lease aircraft charter. Its main base was Orlando International Airport. It is owned by the Air Transport Services Group.

The airline ceased in name in March 2013 when it was merged with its sister airline Air Transport International.

History 
The airline was established in September 1995 and started operations in April 1996. It was founded by Peter Fox, the airline's Chairman, and obtained its operating certificate on April 24, 1996. It is wholly owned by Cargo Holdings International (CHI) and has 265 employees (at June 2011).

On November 2, 2007, Cargo Holdings International, the parent company of CCIA entered into an agreement to be acquired by Wilmington, OH-based ABX Holdings, Inc.  The company along with sister company Air Transport International were run as separate companies under the Air Transport Services Group umbrella until 2013 when Capital Cargo was formally absorbed by Air Transport.

CHI and ABX Holdings have entered into an agreement under which ABX Holdings will purchase the stock of CHI. After the closing of that transaction, CHI and its wholly owned subsidiaries will be held by ABX Holdings as the parent company. ABX Air, Inc., Capital Cargo International Airlines, Inc., and Air Transport International Limited Liability Company will each continue to operate as separate and independent air carriers. Cargo Aircraft Management, Inc. and LGSTX Group, Inc. will also continue to operate as wholly owned subsidiaries of CHI.

Destinations

Canada
Calgary, Alberta (Calgary International Airport)
Caribbean
San Juan, Puerto Rico (Luis Muñoz Marín International Airport)
Dominican Republic
Santiago de los Caballeros (Cibao International Airport)
Santo Domingo (Las Americas International Airport)
Mexico
El Marques, Mexico (Querétaro International Airport)
Guadalajara, Mexico (Guadalajara International Airport)
United States
Atlanta, Georgia (Hartsfield-Jackson Atlanta International Airport)
Boston, Massachusetts (Logan International Airport)
Charlotte, North Carolina (Charlotte Douglas International Airport)
Cincinnati, Ohio (Cincinnati/Northern Kentucky International Airport)
El Paso, Texas (El Paso International Airport)
Fort Lauderdale, Florida (Fort Lauderdale-Hollywood International Airport)
Harlingen, Texas (Valley International Airport)
Hartford, Connecticut (Bradley International Airport)
Memphis, Tennessee (Memphis International Airport)
Miami, Florida (Miami International Airport)
Minneapolis and St. Paul, Minnesota (Minneapolis-Saint Paul International Airport)
Orlando, Florida (Orlando International Airport)
Phoenix, Arizona (Phoenix Sky Harbor International Airport)
Raleigh-Durham, North Carolina (Raleigh-Durham International Airport)
Rochester, New York (Greater Rochester International Airport)
San Diego, California (San Diego International Airport)
Saint Louis, Missouri (Lambert St. Louis International Airport)
Seattle, Washington (King County International Airport)
Toledo, Ohio (Toledo Express Airport)

Fleet
The Capital Cargo International Airlines fleet consists of the following aircraft (as of 2012):

See also 
 List of defunct airlines of the United States

References

External links

Capital Cargo International Airlines
Capital Cargo International Airlines Fleet

Airlines based in Florida
Airlines established in 1995
Airlines disestablished in 2013
Defunct airlines of the United States
Defunct cargo airlines
Companies based in Orlando, Florida
Defunct companies based in Florida
Cargo airlines of the United States